Rheinheimera aquimaris is a Gram-negative, non-spore-forming and motile bacterium from the genus of Rheinheimera which has been isolated from seawater from the Sea of Japan at Hwajinpo in Korea.

References 

Chromatiales
Bacteria described in 2007